Through the Desert is a German-style board game designed by Reiner Knizia.  It was originally released in 1998 by German game publisher, Kosmos, under the name Durch die Wüste.   Players place pastel colored plastic camels on a hexagon-based board in an attempt to score points by capturing watering holes and reaching oases.

Gameplay 

Before the game starts, the board is seeded with watering holes and oases.  Each player then places one camel in each of the five colors with a caravan leader of their color on the board.

On a player's turn, he places two additional camels of any color on the board.  A camel must be played adjacent to a camel of the same color and that group of camels must include the player's caravan leader.  A player may never combine two different groups of the same colored camels.

During the game, players score points by placing a camel on top of a watering hole or playing a camel adjacent to an oasis.  At the end of the game, players score points for the longest caravan (most camels) of each color and for areas that have been enclosed by one of their caravans.

The game ends when the supply of camels for any one color has been exhausted.  The player with the most points wins.

Awards 
Nominee - 1998 Spiel des Jahres award

Reviews
Pyramid

References

External links 
 Through the Desert page at Fantasy Flight Games

Board games about history
Board games introduced in 1998
Fantasy Flight Games games
Kosmos (publisher) games
Reiner Knizia games